Collectors' Lot is a TV programme produced from 1997 to 2001 by Twofour Broadcast for the United Kingdom's Channel 4. Shown on weekday afternoons, the programme visited every corner of Britain to explore the weird and wonderful things that people choose to collect. The five series of the programme featured over 70 expert craftspeople and restorers at work.

During the height of its popularity the show had 2 million viewers a day, making it ' Britain's most successful daytime antiques and collectibles magazine series'.

Presenters of Collectors' Lot included Sarah Greene, Sue Cook, Helen Atkinson-Wood and Debbie Thrower.

References

Collectors' Lot: A Nation of Collectors by Chrissie Kravchenko Publisher: Channel 4 Books (1999)

External links
Twofour Broadcast website and Collectors Lot
Collector's Lot on the Internet Movie Database
Debbie Thrower discusses Collector's Lot
The Best of Collector's Lot on the British Film Institute website

Channel 4 original programming
1997 British television series debuts
2001 British television series endings